Javingue or Javingue-Sevry is a locality in Wallonia and a district of the municipality of Beauraing, located in the province of Namur, Belgium.

The settlement consists of two former villages, Javingue and Sevry, united in a single municipality and today part of Beauraing. During the Middle Ages, Sevry belonged to the Prince-Bishopric of Liège and Javingue to the Duchy of Luxembourg. The 15th century fortified tower  lies in Sevry and still retains much of its medieval appearance.

References

External links

Populated places in Namur (province)